Perforating calcific elastosis  is an acquired, localized cutaneous disorder, most frequently found in obese, multiparous, middle-aged women, characterized by lax, well-circumscribed, reticulated or cobble-stoned plaques occurring in the periumbilical region with keratotic surface papules.

See also 
 List of cutaneous conditions

References 

Abnormalities of dermal fibrous and elastic tissue